Some of Caterpillar Incorporated's current and historic machines include:

 Track-type tractors (bulldozers)
 Caterpillar 10
 Caterpillar 15
 Caterpillar 20
 Caterpillar 25
 Caterpillar 30
 Caterpillar 35
 Caterpillar 40
 Caterpillar 45
 Caterpillar 50
 Caterpillar 60
 Caterpillar 65
 Caterpillar 70
 R-series (Petrol)
 Caterpillar R2
 Caterpillar R4
 Caterpillar R6
 D-series (Diesel)
 Caterpillar D1
 Caterpillar D2
 Caterpillar D3, D3k2
 Caterpillar D4, D4k2
 Caterpillar D5, D5k2
 Caterpillar D6, D6k2
 Caterpillar D6T
 Caterpillar D6XE (Next Gen)
 Caterpillar D7E
 Caterpillar D8T
 Caterpillar D9, D9T
 Caterpillar D10T,D10T2
 Caterpillar D11,D11T
 Pipelayers - Sidebooms
 Caterpillar 594
 Caterpillar 591
 Caterpillar 589
 Caterpillar 587
 Caterpillar 587T
 Caterpillar 583
 Caterpillar 583T
 Caterpillar 578
 Caterpillar 572
 Caterpillar 572RII
 Caterpillar 571
 Caterpillar 561C (standard shift)
 Caterpillar 561D (power shift)
 Caterpillar 561N
 Caterpillar PL61
 Caterpillar PL72
 Caterpillar PL83
 Caterpillar PL87
 Motorgraders
 Caterpillar 12G 
 Caterpillar 12H  Global
 Caterpillar 12M
 Caterpillar 12M2
 Caterpillar 12M3
 Caterpillar 12M3 AWD
 Caterpillar 112
 Caterpillar 120/120 AWD (Next Gen)
 Caterpillar 120G
 Caterpillar 120H
 Caterpillar 120K
 Caterpillar 120M
 Caterpillar 120M2
 Caterpillar 120M3
 Caterpillar 120M3 AWD
 Caterpillar 130G
 Caterpillar 135H
 Caterpillar 140/140 AWD (Next Gen)
 Caterpillar 140/140 AWD - LVR
 Caterpillar 140GC/140GC AWD
 Caterpillar 140G
 Caterpillar 140H
 Caterpillar 140M
 Caterpillar 140M2
 Caterpillar 140M3
 Caterpillar 140M3 AWD
 Caterpillar 14 (Next Gen)
 Caterpillar 14G
 Caterpillar 14H  Global
 Caterpillar 14M
 Caterpillar 14M2
 Caterpillar 14M3
 Caterpillar 14M3 AWD
 Caterpillar 150/150 AWD (Next Gen)
 Caterpillar 16 (Next Gen)
 Caterpillar 16G
 Caterpillar 16H
 Caterpillar 16M
 Caterpillar 16M2
 Caterpillar 16M3
 Caterpillar 160/160 AWD
 Caterpillar 160G
 Caterpillar 160H
 Caterpillar 163H
 Caterpillar 160M
 Caterpillar 160M2
 Caterpillar 160M3
 Caterpillar 160M3 AWD
 Caterpillar 18 (Next Gen)
 Caterpillar 18M3
 Caterpillar 24H
 Caterpillar 24M
 Caterpillar 24 (Next Gen)
 Wheeled Scrapers
 Caterpillar DW21
 Caterpillar 613C
 Caterpillar 623K
 Caterpillar 623H
 Caterpillar 621K
 Caterpillar 627K
 Caterpillar 621H
 Caterpillar 627H
 Caterpillar 627G
 Caterpillar 631G
 Caterpillar 631K
 Caterpillar 637G
 Caterpillar 637K
 Caterpillar 641B
 Caterpillar 657G
 Caterpillar 657
 Wheel type Tractors
 Caterpillar DW10
 Caterpillar DW15 
 Caterpillar DW20
 Caterpillar DW2
 Caterpillar DW4
 Caterpillar DW6
 Articulated Track Tractors
 Challenger Tractor
 Combine harvesters 
 Lexion

 Mini Excavators
 Caterpillar 300.9D, 300.9D VPS
 Caterpillar 301.5
 Caterpillar 301.7 CR
 Caterpillar 301.8
 Caterpillar 301D
 Caterpillar 302D
 Caterpillar 302 CR
 Caterpillar 302.7D CR
 Caterpillar 303E CR
 Caterpillar 303.5E CR
 Caterpillar 303.5E2 CR
 Caterpillar 304E CR
 Caterpillar 304E2 CR
 Caterpillar 305E CR
 Caterpillar 305E2 CR
 Caterpillar 305.5E CR
 Caterpillar 305.5E2 CR
 Small Excavators
 Caterpillar 306 CR
 Caterpillar 307.5
 Caterpillar 308 CR, CR VAB
 Caterpillar 309 CR, CR VAB
 Caterpillar 310
 Caterpillar 306D
 Caterpillar 307E
 Caterpillar 308E
 Caterpillar 311F (L RR)
 Caterpillar 312E L
 Caterpillar 313, 313 GC
 Caterpillar 314E L CR
 Caterpillar 315, 315 GC
 Caterpillar 316E L
 Caterpillar 316F L
 Caterpillar 317, 317 GC
 Caterpillar 318E L
 Caterpillar 318F L
 Medium Excavators
 Caterpillar 320, 320 GC
 Caterpillar 320E L
 Caterpillar 320E L RR
 Caterpillar 321D L CR
 Caterpillar 323
 Caterpillar 323E L
 Caterpillar 324E L
 Caterpillar 325
 Caterpillar 326
 Caterpillar 328D L CR
 Caterpillar 329E
 Caterpillar 330, 330 GC
 Caterpillar 335
 Caterpillar 335F L
 Caterpillar 336E L
 Caterpillar 336E H
 Caterpillar 336F H
 Large Excavators
 Caterpillar 336, 336 GC
 Caterpillar 349, 349E, 349F
 Caterpillar 352
 Caterpillar 352F
 Caterpillar 374
 Caterpillar 374F L
 Caterpillar 385C
 Caterpillar 390F L
 Caterpillar 395
 Ultra-High Demolition Excavators
 Caterpillar 340 Straight Boom
 Caterpillar 330D UHD
 Caterpillar 340F UHD
 Caterpillar 345D UHD
 Caterpillar 352 UHD
 Caterpillar 365D UHD
 Caterpillar 385D UHD
 Caterpillar 390D UHD
 Long Reach Excavators
 Caterpillar 340 Long Boom
 Caterpillar 352F LRE
 Caterpillar 352 LRE
 Wheel Excavators
 Caterpillar M314
 Caterpillar M315F
 Caterpillar M316F
 Caterpillar M316
 Caterpillar M317F
 Caterpillar M318
 Caterpillar M318F
 Caterpillar M319
 Caterpillar M320F
 Caterpillar M320
 Caterpillar M322F
 Extra-Large Mining Excavators
 Caterpillar 6015B
 Caterpillar 6018B
 Caterpillar 6020B
 Caterpillar 6020/6020FS
 Caterpillar 6030B
 Caterpillar 6030 AC
 Caterpillar 6030/6030FS
 Caterpillar 6040/6040FS
 Caterpillar 6050/6050FS
 Caterpillar 6060/6060FS
 Caterpillar 6060 AC
 Caterpillar 6090FS
 Backhoe Loaders
 Caterpillar 415/415 IL
 Caterpillar 415F2/415F2 IL
 Caterpillar 416, 416F2
 Caterpillar 420
 Caterpillar 420F2/420F2 IT
 Caterpillar 420XE
 Caterpillar 426/426 Series II
 Caterpillar 428F2
 Caterpillar 430
 Caterpillar 430F2/420F2 IT
 Caterpillar 432F2
 Caterpillar 450
 Skid steer, wheeled
Caterpillar 226D3
Caterpillar 232D3
Caterpillar 236D3
Caterpillar 242D3
Caterpillar 246D3
Caterpillar 262D3
Caterpillar 272D3
Caterpillar 272D3 XE
 Skid steer, tracked
Caterpillar 239D3
Caterpillar 249D3
Caterpillar 259D3
Caterpillar 279D3
Caterpillar 289D3
Caterpillar 299D3
Caterpillar 299D3 XE
Caterpillar 299D3 XE Land Management
 Feller bunchers & Harvesters, tracked
 Caterpillar 511/521/522/532
 Caterpillar 521B/522B
 Caterpillar 541/551/552
Feller buncher, wheeled
 Caterpillar 533/543
 Caterpillar 573
 Caterpillar 586C Site Prep Tractor
 Skidder, wheeled
 Caterpillar 515
 Caterpillar 518
 Caterpillar 525D
 Caterpillar 528
 Caterpillar 530B
 Caterpillar 535,535B,535C,535D
 Caterpillar 545,545B,545C,545D
 Caterpillar 555D
 Skidder, tracked
 Caterpillar 517
 Caterpillar 527
 Harvester, wheeled
 Caterpillar 550
 Caterpillar 570
 Caterpillar 580
 Forwarder, wheeled
 Caterpillar 534
 Caterpillar 544
 Caterpillar 554
 Caterpillar 564
 Caterpillar 574
 Caterpillar 584
 Forest Machines
 Caterpillar 538
 Caterpillar 548
 Caterpillar 558
 Caterpillar 568
 Knuckleboom Loader
 Caterpillar 519, 529, 539, 559, 559B, 569, 579
 Material handler
Caterpillar MH3022
Caterpillar MH3024
Caterpillar MH3026
Caterpillar MH3040
Caterpillar MH3250
Caterpillar MH3260
 Track Loaders 
 Caterpillar 931
 Caterpillar 933
 Caterpillar 935
 Caterpillar 939
 Caterpillar 943
 Caterpillar 951
 Caterpillar 953, 953K
 Caterpillar 955
 Caterpillar 963
 Caterpillar 973, 973K
 Caterpillar 977
 Caterpillar 983

Wheel Loaders
 Caterpillar 903D
 Caterpillar 906M
 Caterpillar 907M
 Caterpillar 908M
 Caterpillar 910
 Caterpillar 910M
 Caterpillar 914
 Caterpillar 914M
 Caterpillar 918M
 Caterpillar 920
Caterpillar 924G
 Caterpillar 926
 Caterpillar 926M
Caterpillar 930
 Caterpillar 930M
 Caterpillar 938
 Caterpillar 938M
 Caterpillar IT38
 Caterpillar 950
 Caterpillar 950M
 Caterpillar 950 GC
 Caterpillar 962
 Caterpillar 962M
 Caterpillar IT62
 Caterpillar 966, 966M
 Caterpillar 966M XE
 Caterpillar 972, 972M
 Caterpillar 980, 980M
 Caterpillar 982, 982M
 Caterpillar 986, 986K
 Caterpillar 988, 988K
 Caterpillar 988K XE
 Caterpillar 990, 990K
 Caterpillar 992, 992K
 Caterpillar 993K
 Caterpillar 994, 994K
 Caterpillar R1300, R1300G
 Caterpillar R1600, R1600G, R1600H
 Caterpillar R1700, R1700G
 Caterpillar R2900, R2900G
 Caterpillar R3000H
 Articulated Dump truck (ADT)
 Caterpillar 725, 725C, 725C2
 Caterpillar 730, 730C, 730C2, 730EJ
 Caterpillar 735, 735B, 735C
 Caterpillar 740, 740B, 740C
 Caterpillar 740EJ, 740B Ejector, 740C EJ
 Caterpillar 740GC
 Caterpillar 745C, 745C Water Tank
 Caterpillar AD22
 Caterpillar AD30
 Caterpillar AD45, AD45B
 Caterpillar AD60
 Caterpillar AD63
 Rigid Dump Trucks
 Caterpillar 769, 796B
 Caterpillar 769C, 796D
 Caterpillar 770G
 Caterpillar 771C, 771D
 Caterpillar 772, 772G
 Caterpillar 773
 Caterpillar 773B, 773D, 773E
 Caterpillar 773F, 773G
 Caterpillar 775B, 775D, 775E
 Caterpillar 775F, 775G
 Caterpillar 777
 Caterpillar 779, 783 (electric)
 Caterpillar 785, 785B, 785C, 785D, 785 (Next Gen)
 Caterpillar 789
 Caterpillar 793, 793B, 793C, 793D, 793F
 Caterpillar 794 AC
 Caterpillar 795F AC
 Caterpillar 796 AC
 Caterpillar 797
 Caterpillar 797B
 Caterpillar 797F
 Caterpillar 798 AC
Haul Truck - semi trailer
 Caterpillar 768C
 Caterpillar 772B
 Caterpillar 776, 776B, 776C, 776D
 Caterpillar 784B, 784C
 Caterpillar 786 (prototype)
Rollers
 Caterpillar CB14
 Caterpillar CB1.7
 Caterpillar CB1.8
 Caterpillar CB22B
 Caterpillar CB24, CB24B, CB24BXT, CC24B
 Caterpillar CB2.7/CC2.7
 Caterpillar CB2.9
 Caterpillar CB32B
 Caterpillar CB34B/CC34B
 Caterpillar CB36B
 Caterpillar CB7
 Caterpillar CB8
 Caterpillar CB10
 Caterpillar CB13
 Caterpillar CB15
 Caterpillar CB16
 Caterpillar CB54XW
 Caterpillar CB64
 Caterpillar CB-114
 Caterpillar CB-224
 Caterpillar CB-334
 Caterpillar CB-434
 Caterpillar CB-534
 Caterpillar CB-544
 Caterpillar CB-564
 Caterpillar CB-634
 Caterpillar CD8
 Caterpillar CD10
 Caterpillar CCS7
 Caterpillar CCS9
 Caterpillar CS10GC
 Caterpillar CS11GC/CP11GC 
 Caterpillar CS12GC/CP12GC 
 Caterpillar CS34/CP34
 Caterpillar CS44B/CP44B
 Caterpillar CS54B/CP54B
 Caterpillar CS56/CP56, CS56B/CP56B
 Caterpillar CS68B/CP68B
 Caterpillar CS76/CP76/CS76XT
 Caterpillar CS78
 Caterpillar CS-323
 Caterpillar CS-433
 Caterpillar CS-531
 Caterpillar CS-533/CP-533
 Caterpillar CS-533E
 Caterpillar CS-563/CP-563
 Caterpillar CS-583
 Caterpillar CW34
 Caterpillar CW16 (9 or 11 wheel)
Wheel Dozer/Soil/Landfill Compactors
 Caterpillar 814/815/816
 Caterpillar 814K/815K/816K
 Caterpillar 824K
 Caterpillar 825K/826K
 Caterpillar 834K/836K
 Caterpillar 844K
 Caterpillar 854G,854K
Asphalt Pavers - tracked
 Caterpillar AP335F
 Caterpillar AP555F
 Caterpillar AP655F
 Caterpillar AP1055F
Asphalt Pavers - wheeled
 Caterpillar AP300F
 Caterpillar AP500F
 Caterpillar AP600F
 Caterpillar AP1000F
Asphalt Pavers - Screed 
 Caterpillar SE50 V, SE50 VT
 Caterpillar SE60 V,  SE60 V XW, SE60 VT XW
Cold Planers
Caterpillar PM310 (track, wheel)
Caterpillar PM312 (track, wheel)
Caterpillar PM313 (track, wheel)
Caterpillar PM-565
Caterpillar PM620
Caterpillar PM622
Caterpillar PM820
Caterpillar PM822
Caterpillar PM825
Road Reclaimers
Caterpillar RM400
Caterpillar RM400B
On-road trucks
 Cat CT660
Draglines
 Caterpillar 8000
 Caterpillar 8200
 Caterpillar 8750
Rope Shovels
 Caterpillar 7495
 Caterpillar 7495 HF
 Caterpillar 7495 HD
 Caterpillar 7395
 Caterpillar 7295
Bucket Wheel Excavator
 Caterpillar 7495BWE
Drills
 Caterpillar MD6200
 Caterpillar MD6240
 Caterpillar MD6250
 Caterpillar MD6290
 Caterpillar MD6310
 Caterpillar MD6420
 Caterpillar MD6540
 Caterpillar MD6640
 Caterpillar MD5150
 Caterpillar MD5050
 Caterpillar MD5075
 Caterpillar MD5090
 Caterpillar MD5125
Telehandlers
 Caterpillar TH255C
 Caterpillar TH357D
 Caterpillar TH408D
 Caterpillar TH514D
 Caterpillar TH560B
 Caterpillar TH580B
 Caterpillar TH3510D
 Caterpillar TL642D
 Caterpillar TL943D
 Caterpillar TL1055D
 Caterpillar TL1255D
Forklifts
 CAT EC15N,EC18N; EC18LN
 CAT EC23N,EC25N,EC25EN
 CAT EC25LN,EC30N,EC30LN
 CAT 2ET2500,2ETC3000,2ET3000
 CAT 2ETC3500,2ET3500,2ET4000
 CAT EPC3000,EP3000
 CAT EPC3500,EP3500,EP4000
 CAT 2EPC5000,2EP5000,2EPC6000,2EP6000,2EP6500
 CAT 2EPC7000,2EPC8000,2EP8000
 CAT 2EP8500,2EPC9000,2EP9000,2EP10000,2EP11000
 CAT 2C3000,2C3500
 CAT 2CC4000
 CAT 2C4000,2C5000
 CAT 2C5500,2C6000,2C6500
 CAT 2C7000,2C8000
 CAT GC35K,GC40K,GC40K STR,GC45K,GC45K STR
 CAT GC55K,GC55K STR	
 CAT GC60K,GC70K,GC70K STR	
 CAT GP15N,GP18N,GP20CN
 CAT GP20N,DP20N,GP25N,DP25N
 CAT GP28N,DP28N,GP30N,DP30N,GP33N,DP33N 
 CAT GP35N,DP35N
 CAT GP40N,DP40N
 CAT GP45N,DP45N,GP50CND,P50CN,GP50N,DP50N,GP55N,DP55N
 CAT DP70N1
Utility vehicles
 Caterpillar CUV82
 Caterpillar CUV85
 Caterpillar CUV102D
 Caterpillar CUV105D

See also
 G-numbers for U.S. Army Caterpillar tractors

Technology-related lists